Town Center at Boca Raton, often referred to as Boca Town Center, Town Center Mall, or simply Town Center, is an upscale shopping mall located in Boca Raton, Florida (approximately 30 miles south of West Palm Beach and 20 miles north of Fort Lauderdale), that has been owned and operated by Simon Property Group since 1998.

The mall is home to five major department store anchors: Bloomingdale's, Macy's, Neiman Marcus, Nordstrom, and Saks Fifth Avenue. Notable tenants among 200+ merchants including The Container Store, Crate & Barrel, Forever 21, Apple Store, Tesla, Pandora Jewelry, Louis Vuitton, and many others. The mall is the largest enclosed and conventional shopping mall in Palm Beach County, and is the third largest in total by square footage in South Florida, behind Sawgrass Mills and Aventura Mall.

History
The mall opened on August 13, 1980 on a site just west of Interstate 95 directly on Glades Road. Originally, the one-story mall was anchored by Florida-based Burdines, which was constructed in June 1979, a year before the rest of the mall, including Jordan Marsh and Sears (debuted October 29, 1980) as the second and third anchors. This was a similar fashion to Broward Mall two years earlier and Miami International Mall two years later.  At the time of opening, the mall had 100 stores and featured a Mediterranean Revival theme with a round black station clock, living vegetation below a series of atriums, and several distinctive wishing fountains. The mall's was developed by Federated Stores, the parent company of Burdines, on land owned by Arvida Corp., serving as a retail hub for the flourishing western Boca Raton area prior to becoming a super-regional shopping center on its own right.

While the Sears, Bloomingdale's, and {eventually} Nordstrom  locations remained the same throughout most of the mall's history, the other three anchor pads changed as a result of mergers, acquisitions, and relocations. In 1991, Jordan Marsh shut down due to Allied Stores and then was sold to Mervyns in 1992, which in turn closed in 1995 and was refurbished by a larger Saks Fifth Avenue, which had a two-year construction period until 1999 including a new second floor entrance to the new parking deck. This caused razing the original building to make way for another new concourse featuring  Florida's first Nordstrom store in 2000. The mall was renovated as a result, and parking layouts were rearranged to allow a three-story parking garage at Nordstrom, and a two-story garage at the recently refurbished Burdines (now Macy's) and larger Saks (formerly JM). Then, Lord & Taylor shuttered entirely in 2004 during a retreat into the Northeast, and was succeeded by Neiman Marcus, who wanted to be in Boca since 1987 and opened in 2005. The Burdines location was converted to Burdines-Macy's in 2003 and then simply Macy's also in 2005. Moreover, the food court's seating was reconfigured to accommodate more people, and a Waldenbooks (which closed in 2010) opened on its southern side. Mall entrances were remodeled with sun canopies and decorative towers to add exterior appeal. Another garage by Bloomingdale's and lifestyle center called The Terrace at Town Center were completed in 2007 featuring Crate & Barrel and Youfit Health Clubs. Macy’s expanded again that same year, adding a third floor.  The mixed-use development is in between the expanded Bloomingdale's and the Nordstrom parking garage.

In 2015, Sears Holdings spun of 235 of its properties, including the Sears at Town Center at Boca Raton, into Seritage Growth Properties.

On January 4, 2018, it was announced that the Boca Town Center Sears would be closing as part of a plan to shut down 103 stores nationwide, making it the mall's last original anchor to close. The store closed on April 8, 2018. A year later, Seritage Growth Properties announced plans to demolish the store for a 250,000 square foot open air complex called The Collection at Boca Town Center. It will provide shopping, dining, and entertainment similar to the lifestyle center in Aventura Mall. It is tentatively scheduled to be complete in 2020. Simon is attempting to block plans for the project stating it violates a 1985 agreement with the mall for using the space for something other than traditional retail.

Incidents

2007 murders
In 2007, several murders at the mall drew national attention. In March, a 52-year-old woman was kidnapped and murdered. In December, a 47-year-old woman and her 7-year-old daughter were also kidnapped, and later found bound and shot in the head in the woman's SUV in the mall parking lot. This case was featured on America's Most Wanted and caused host John Walsh to say he believed a serial killer to be in the city. Though there is no forensic evidence to suggest the murders were committed by the same person, the similarities in the cases led police to believe they were related. In addition, a similar incident occurred at the mall in August, in which a woman and her 2-year-old son were kidnapped and tied up in their car, but left alive. To this day, the murders all remain unsolved.

2019 active shooter scare
On October 13, 2019, shoppers allegedly heard quick pops reminiscent of gunfire, leading to a mall-wide panic. SWAT teams conducted grid searches across the mall, later evacuating patrons and employees on a store-by-store basis. After clearing the mall, investigators determined that there was no evidence of any gunfire, and that the only injury, other than minor injuries as results of tripping and falling in the midst of the chaos, was a trauma wound faced by a man evacuating, running into a door. Police found that the noise came from a janitor in the food court who popped a balloon stuck to his trash cart.

2022 shooting
A shooting took place on mall property on April 6, 2022, injuring one person in the leg and prompting a large police presence. The mall was briefly locked down, leading some visitors and staff to shelter in place, but an active shooter threat was quickly dismissed and the incident was categorized as "isolated".

Anchors
Current:
 Bloomingdale's (opened as part of 1986 mall expansion) (1986–Present)
 Macy's (former Burdines location)    (2005–Present)
 Neiman Marcus (former Lord & Taylor location) (2005–Present)
 Nordstrom (built within south concourse) (2000–Present)
 Saks Fifth Avenue {CURRENT LOCATION} (former Jordan Marsh and Mervyn's location) (1999–present)  
Former:
 Jordan Marsh {ORIGINAL TENANT} (closed in 1991 and became Mervyn’s in 1992) (1980-1991) 
 Mervyn's (closed in 1995 and replaced by the relocated Saks Fifth Avenue) (1992-1995)
 Lord & Taylor (closed in 2004 and replaced by Neiman Marcus) (1986-2004)
 Burdines {ORIGINAL TENANT} (became Macy's in 2005) (1979-2005)
 Sears {ORIGINAL TENANT} (closed on April 8, 2018 and the store is to be demolished into an outdoor village featuring shops and restaurants) (1980-2018)
 Saks Fifth Avenue {ORIGINAL LOCATION} (opened as part of 1986 mall expansion, moved to its current location in 1999) (1986-1999)

Junior anchors
 Crate and Barrel (opened 2007)
 Forever 21 (opened 2012)

References

External links
Town Center at Boca Raton official website
Original mall stores and floor plan

Shopping malls in Palm Beach County, Florida
Shopping malls established in 1980
Buildings and structures in Boca Raton, Florida
Simon Property Group
1980 establishments in Florida